Euphorbia lavrani is a species of plant in the family Euphorbiaceae. It is endemic to Namibia.  Its natural habitat is rocky areas.

References

Endemic flora of Namibia
lavrani
Least concern plants
Taxonomy articles created by Polbot